The Lakeside Hammers were a speedway team who most recently raced in the SGB Championship in 2018. They were founded (as the Arena-Essex Hammers) by promoter Wally Mawdsley and stock car promoter Chick Woodroffe. The team were nicknamed the Hammers after the West Ham Hammers, a speedway team that closed twelve years earlier. The team's home track, the Arena Essex Raceway, closed shortly before the end of the 2018 season and the team did not compete in a league in 2019.

History
From foundation in 1984 until January 2007, the club was known as the Arena-Essex Hammers but new promoter Stuart Douglas renamed them the 'Lakeside' Hammers at the Arena-Essex Raceway. The Arena Essex Raceway was built in 1978 to stage banger racing. The original Arena-Essex Hammers promotion touted them as the successors to or the reincarnation of the old West Ham Speedway which had closed in the early 1970s - the team took the Hammers nickname, the race colours of white crossed hammers on red and blue halves, and the racenight programmes also carried photos of past West Ham riders from the 1930s through to the early 1970s. There was even a direct link to West Ham speedway within the original Arena-Essex team itself - Alan Sage had ridden for West Ham at the start of his career in 1970-71.

The speedway track was unusual because it did not have a safety fence as the stock car circuit acted as a run-off area. It was not until 1991 that a safety fence was installed, but the lack of fence encouraged the riders to ride wider lines than they would otherwise have done.

The Hammers competed in the National League (the second league tier) from 1984 until 1990. In 1991 Arena Essex won the British League Division Two Championship and were promoted to the British League. They remained in the top flight until the end of the 1995 season, when a promotion change meant the Hammers had to drop to the Conference League for 1996. From 1997 to 2003, Arena Essex competed in the Premier League, before moving up into the Elite League, the top league of British speedway.

The team manager is Jon Cook (previously of the Eastbourne Eagles). The Promoter Stuart Douglas, known affectionately to Hammers fans as 'Stan', took control of the club in 2006.

In 2008, the club had one of its most successful years. The Hammers finished joint top of the Elite League table, but due to race points, were in second place. The Hammers lost three of their top four riders with serious injuries towards the end of the season, but still reached the Craven Shield and Elite League play-off finals.

In 2009, the club won their first piece of silverware since 1991. They defeated the Coventry Bees 108–77 on aggregate in the KO Cup Final.

In 2018 the team opted to move up in to the SGB Championship after competing in the National League for 2017. In September 2018, speedway racing ceased at the track, and the Hammers moved to the Rye House Hoddesden raceway to complete their fixtures.

Season summary

Riders previous seasons

2018 team

2017 team

Also rode:

2016 team

2015 team

 (DU)

 (DU)
 (DU)
 (DU)
 (DU)

2014 team

 (DU)
 - Fast Track
 - Fast Track

2013 team

 (DU)
(DU)

Also rode:

2012 team

The team finished in 4th place out of 10, qualifying for the play-offs, making it the 4th time in 5 years.

 8.61
 8.06
 5.93
(DU) 4.90
(DU) 5.09
 4.44
 5.45
 (DU) 3.00
 (DU) 3.69

Also rode:
 8.20

2011 team

The team finished 4th from 10, making the playoffs; however, they were eliminated by Eastbourne in the semi-finals.

 8.06
 6.88
 6.23
 5.60
(DU) 5.07
(DU) 5.22
 4.83
 4.15
(No 8)

Also rode:

(DU)
(DU)
(DU)
(No 8)

2010 team

The 2010 team finished in 5th place from 9 teams, narrowly missing out on the playoffs.

 8.67
 6.51
 7.39
 5.35
 4.03
 5.17
 3.91
 (No 8) 3.49

Also rode:
 8.33
 4.91
 (No 8) –

2009 team

Lakeside finished 3rd out of 9, qualifying for the playoffs, but lost to Wolverhampton in the playoff semi-finals. The team became K.O Cup Champions by defeating Coventry.

 8.56
 7.97
 6.02
 5.63
 4.17
(DU) 3.56
(DU) 2.29
 (No 8) 3.23
 7.79

Also rode:
 7.82
(DU) Riders doubling-up between Premier and Elite League

2008 team

The team finished joint top on points with Poole, but lost the playoff final to an aggregate score of 108 – 75 to the Pirates. They also reached the Final of the Craven Shield, losing to Coventry.

 9.66
 8.10
 6.40
 6.75
 5.10
 4.90
 –
 (No.8) 6.56

Also Rode:
 5.96
 (as No.8) –
 4.48
 2.00

2007 team

The revamped Lakeside Hammers finished 5th from 10 teams (after the closure of Oxford).

 8.00
 6.12
 8.68
 7.40
 5.05
 3.37
 3.49
 3.11
 (No.8) 2.86

Also Rode
 4.05
 4.00
 4.07
 –

2006 team

Arena Essex finished 11th out of 11, placing them bottom of the Elite League for a second consecutive season.

 5.20
 5.35
 7.56
 5.92
 6.33
 2.88
 5.59

Also Rode
 7.56
 3.26
 1.40
 (No.8) 3.25
 (No.8) 3.75

2005 team

The 2005 side finished bottom of the Elite League.

 7.75
 5.96
 5.60
 5.39
 4.76
 5.12
 5.08
 (No.8) 4.02

Also Rode
 9.83
 4.00
 3.67

2004 team

Although the team finished 8th from 10 in their first season in the Elite League, they were 14 points above 9th place.

 9.66
 5.71
 5.67
 5.02
 5.13
 5.21
 5.10
 (No.8) –

Also Rode
 3.70
 5.75

2003 team

The team finished 7th out of 18 teams. It would be their last at Premier League level.

 9.06
 9.38
 7.85
 5.68
 3.96
 2.82
 4.76

Also Rode
 7.41
 3.15

1998 team

The team finished 11th out of 13 teams. 

 
 
 8.71

References

Speedway Elite League teams
SGB Championship teams
Speedway teams in Essex
Sport in Thurrock